Haridasa Thakur (IAST ) (born 1451 or 1450) was a prominent Vaishnava saint known for being instrumental in the initial propagation of the Hare Krishna movement. He is considered to be the most famous convert of Chaitanya Mahaprabhu, apart from Rupa Goswami and Sanatana Goswami. His story of integrity and unflinching faith in the face of extreme adversity is told in Chaitanya Charitamrita, Antya lila. Haridasa Thakura, was a devotee of God, Krishna, and had practiced chanting the names of the Lord, Hare Krishna, 300,000 times daily.

Background

Haridasa Thakur was a prominent Vaishnava convert from Islam and is now venerated as a Hindu saint. From the very beginning of Chaitanya's 16th century bhakti movement in Bengal, Haridasa Thakur and other born Muslims as well as those of various faiths joined together to spread love of God. This openness received a boost from Bhaktivinoda Thakura's broad-minded vision in the late 19th century and was institutionalized by Bhaktisiddhanta Sarasvati in his Gaudiya Matha in the 20th century. A disciple of Bhaktisiddhanta, Srila A. C. Bhaktivedanta Swami Prabhupada, is the founder of the International Society for Krishna Consciousness, that celebrates festivals memory of Haridasa Thakura in India and worldwide.

However one of the early records of the period by Isana Nagara, (c. 1564), author of the Advaita-prakasa, describes contemporary condition of the Hindus under 'Ala-ud-din Hussain Shah (1493–1519):

Sources

According to Murari Gupta's Krishna chaitanya charitamria, mlecchas (a word used for those who do not follow the four regulative principles) are the objects of Lords saving mercy, and as is the case of Haridasa shows, it produces even a great saint. While in contrast to this, another biographer, Kavi Karnapura, in his Krishna Chaitanya Chartamritam Maha-vakyam, written in Sanskrit in 1542, makes no explicit references to Islam, and when referring to the famed saint Haridasa, the author does not speak of his parentage. The earliest biography however, Chaitanya Bhagavata, would avoid use of the word 'mleccha', but would use 'yavana' some fifty times and it appears that the author himself knows more about Islam than an average Hindu will do.  While some contend that Haridasa was born of Muslim parents and instead was simply brought up by them, Chaitanya Bhagavata suggests that apostasy from Islam was a capital offense in Bengal at the time and local qazi became aware of the conversion of Haridasa and brought him before the district governor, also a Muslim. Haridasa defends himself on the basis that there is only one God with many names. In this remarkable scene and speech Vaishnava convert Haridasa Thakur refuses to recite from a Muslim scripture, and was therefore sentenced, beaten and left for dead in the river. He however recovered instantly, convincing many he was a pir, a special mystical person. As a result, according to the author of Chaitanya Bhagavata, qazi was removed from the office. Some suggest that the episode illustrates, that it was the pressure of  communal prestige rather than desire of the governor to instill the law, that resulted in the punishment of Haridasa, when he was caned on the marketplaces. In contrast with it, even if Hussain Shah was depicted as a destructive ruler in Orissa, author attests that many yavanas were devoted to Chaitanya, and would weep over Chaitanya and confess their faith in him.

The elements of the historiographies of Chaitanya Mahaprabhu, Chaitanya Charitamrta and Chaitanya Bhagavata contain main points illustrating the religious bigotry of the Muslims and the consequent persecution of the Hindus, Vaishnavas at the period. Both books retell a famous episode in the life of Chaitanya. He had introduced the public worship in the form of public kirtana and this enraged the local Muslim ruler. To prevent the recurrences of public kirtana the qazi patrolled the streets of Nadiya with a party. After organizing a large civil march, Chaitanya discussed with quazi the situation, who appears in more chastened mood. Author of Chaitanya Charitamrita attributes the change in the quazi's attitude to a miracle. In Chaitanya Chariamrita however it appears describes an overriding order by a superior of quazi to respect sankirtan Chaitanya, that was issued by the Husain Shah himself, who was impressed with the popularity of the saint. Ishana in chapter 7 of his Advaita-prakasa introduces Haridasa, being originally a Muslim, Haridasa is such an anomalous figure that his presence in the community seems to require explanation. Although Chaitanya himself insisted that anyone who is devoted to Krishna automatically becomes a brahmana, there were only very few non-brahmana, who played a role of leadership in the young group of Gaudiya Vaishnava movement. Ishana uses a reference from Bhagavata Purana (S.Bhag 10.13-14) to support high place of Haridasa in Gaudiya Vaishnavism, and to illustrate spiritual power of his guru, Advaita, to elevate him to such a position.
He is a great saint

Early life

Born in the village of Buron (Budana), in the present district of Sat-khira, which was previously a sub-division of Khulna, now in Bangladesh.  Haridasa was 35 years older than Chaitanya Mahaprabhu and his prayers along with prayers of Advaita Acharya were the reason for Chaitanya Mahaprabhu descent. Ishana Nagara in his book Advaita Prakasha, explains in great length that Haridasa Thakur was a follower of Advaita Acharya and also his close friend, he was raised in a Muslim family and then converted to Vaishnavism as a young man. Advaita Acharya repeatedly proclaims that becoming a Vaishnava, regardless of one's background, removes all past conditioning.

When Haridasa Thakura was a young devotee of the Lord, he was allured by the incarnation of Maya-devi, but Haridasa easily passed the test because of his unalloyed devotion to Lord Krsna. He also believed to have stayed and chanted in a cave with a notorious snake, however, seemed unaffected by all of this. He did not even seem to be aware of the snake's presence.

Haridasa first became associated with Advaita Acarya. Haricarana Dasa, the biographer of Advaita Acharya says that all the demigods in heaven heard prayers of Advaita and reveal themselves to him, therefore when Advaita saw Haridasa, he could immediately recognize that he was Brahma incarnate and named him Hari-dasa (literary meaning servant of God). He instructs Haridasa to recite Krishna's names and assures him that Krishna will always show mercy to Haridasa. The close relationship between the two and the fact that Advaita was feeding a Muslim, became a subject of malicious gossip. This apparent anomaly created a stir in the local brahmana community. Others couldn't understand why a powerful ascetic was disregarding a convention of staying away from Muslims.  The fact that community was disturbed is reflected in both Chaitanya Charitamrita and in Chaitanya Bhagavata. Haricarana Dasa, according to historical records, confirms that while Advaita was from the higher ranks of  Bengali brahmana community, he completely ignored the facts about Haridasa's background, impressed with the young man's heartfelt devotion.  While others became upset with Advaita's attention to Haridasa, and threatened to excommunicate Advaita, Advaita tells Haridasa to pay no attention to 'those petty people'.

Legend says that one  morning, Advaita schedules a fire ceremony, agnihotra. When preparations for this ritual is about to begin, there is no fire to be found in the whole town. The ceremony is thus stranded and couldn't proceed. Advaita points out to all local brahmana priests that if priests are true to their religious teachings, there must be fire, and tells them to approach Haridasa with dried grass in their hands. When Haridasa kindles the grasses by his potency, he also, according to this record, manifests his four-faced Brahma-like form. While Agni, the deity of Vedas responsible for fire, should have been under the control of the brahmanas, it's only the Muslim born Haridasa who ignites the fires, by the power of his devotion, 'the purity those born brahmana have lost'.

Teachings

According to the philosophy of the holy name given by Haridasa Thakura, if you are on the platform of namabhasa (early or reflective stage of the pure chanting), it gives the chanter liberation, moksa. Whereas pure chanting gives prema, or 'Love of God'.

An episode from Chaitanya Charitamrita illustrates different side of the life of Haridasa Thakura, and does not allude to the trial of the Haridasa by the Muslim ruler, but gives details of a sakta brahmana, who would hire a harlot to try (unsuccessfully) to seduce the celibate saint. In this story the avenging instruments of divine justice are none other than the agents of the Muslim king, who eventually punishes Ramachandra Khan.(CC Antya. 3.98-163)

Haridasa Thakur was chanting mantra consisting of the names Hare, Krishna and Rama. Hare Krishna mantra appears originally in the :

Hare Krishna Hare Krishna
Krishna Krishna Hare Hare
Hare Rama Hare Rama
Rama Rama Hare Hare

It is often referred to as the "Maha Mantra" (great mantra) by practitioners.

Following the footsteps of Haridasa Thakur in 1966, A.C. Bhaktivedanta Swami Prabhupada established ISKCON (the International Society for Krishna Consciousness), a branch of the Brahma-Madhva-Gaudiya Vaishnava sampradaya, and introduced the Hare Krishna mantra to the West, described as: "an easy yet sublime way of liberation in the Age of Kali."

Preaching of Hare Krishna chanting
He was asked to join forces with Nityananda who was older than Chaitanya by some eight years, and he believed to infuse into the movement a great passion. Haridasa and Nityananda are famed for  conversion of two notorious scoundrels, Jagai and Madhai, of Navadvipa into the new faith. They are considered important lieutenants in the campaign for spreading the sankirtana movement, chanting of the holy names: Brahma, in the form of Haridasa  Thakura, and later, Balarama as Nityananda.

Other associates of Chaitanya called Haridas
Different associates of Chaitanya with this name include:

1. Haridasa Pandita (also known as Sri Raghu Gopala and as Sri Rasa-manjari), a disciple of Sri Ananta Acaryam. He is according to Tarapada Mukherjee is of a later generation. The fact that he is mentioned in the verses derived from Chaitanya Charitamrita, Adi 8 as a listener rather than participants in lila distinguishes them from contemporaries like that of Rupa and the others mentioned who were direct associates of Chaitanya. However according to Krishnadasa Kaviraja, the book which was read in the meetings of the first generation of Chaitanya followers in Vrindavan was the Bhagavata Purana itself and not Chaitanya's life story.
2. Haridas (Junior), who accompanied Chaitanya on the journey to South India. It is believed that Chaitanya forsook the company of Junior Haridas because of an incident, that was against strict principles of a detached saint.

Identity

Haridasa Thakur in Gaudiya Vaishnavism is believed to be a combined incarnation of Brahma Mahatapa, the son of Richika Muni and Prahlada. The respected Murari Gupta has written in his Chaitanya Charitamrita that this sage's son picked a tulasi leaf and offered it to Krishna without having washed it first. His father then cursed him to become a mleccha in his next life. He was thus born as Haridasa, a great devotee.
(Gaura-ganoddesha-dipika 93-95)

Nabadwip-dhama-mahatmya by Bhaktivinoda Thakur has written the following account of how Brahma became Haridasa Thakur:

From the above it is understood that he was an incarnation of the secondary creator Brahma. It is said that in order to overcome his pride, he asked for a birth in a lowly family. Similar description is found in Advaita-vilasa.

Last years
Last years Haridasa has spent in Jagannatha Puri as a close associate of Chaitanya Mahaprabhu. One time Caitanya Mahaprabhu took Haridasa Thakura within the flower garden, and in a very secluded place He showed him his residence. He asked Haridasa to remain there and chant the Hare Krishna mantra, and said that He would personally come there to meet him every day. “Remain here peacefully and look at the cakra on top of the temple and offer obeisances. As for as your prasadam is concerned, I shall arrange to have it sent here”. Although Haridasa was not allowed to visit the temple because of the custom, Chaitanya promised to come and see him daily. To the belief of Gaudiya Vaishnavas this indicates that Haridasa Thakura was so advanced in spiritual life that although he was considered unfit to enter the temple of Jagannatha, he's being personally visited by the lord every day.  Prabhupada however on a number of occasions states that one should not imitate the behavior of Haridasa Thakura. He says the spiritual master gives different orders to different disciples:

Death (Disappearance)
He reasons ill who tells that Vaishnavas die When thou art living still in Sound! The Vaishnavas die to live & living try To spread the holy name around!
Verse by Bhaktivinoda Thakura on the tomb of Haridasa Thakura at Puri, India, published in Swami Prabhupada's Narada Bhakti Sutra, (3.50, purport).

It is believed that Haridasa was buried on the ocean shore by Caitanya himself. Dr. A. N. Chatterjee makes a point in his doctoral thesis entitled "Chaitanya's impact on medieval Indian society" that death of Haridasa Thakura is one of the most important incidents which deserve mention when dealing with the last few years of Caitanya Mahaprabhus life. Haridasa dies after most of other Gaudiya Vaishnavas depart home from Puri, he collapses one day while singing Krishnas name. He is then placing a foot of Chaitanya Mahaprabhu on his chest and dies crying out "Sri Krishna Chaitanya".
Even when mahatmas, great souls, do appear in human society, they are often not appreciated or understood. Illustrating Gaudiya Vaishnava perspective on it Prabhupada writes:

However, if one gets the association of a such mahatma and is receptive to his blessings, it is believed that one will infallibly be benefited.

Books

Further information
For more details of his life story see Chaitanya Bhagavata In this text Haridasa's tribulations are given in detail.

References

External links

 

 

 

1450s births
16th-century Hindu religious leaders
Converts to Hinduism from Islam
Devotees of Krishna
Devotees of Jagannath
Kirtan performers
Medieval Hindu religious leaders
Spiritual teachers
Gaudiya religious leaders
Indian former Muslims
Indian Vaishnavites
Vaishnava saints
Year of death unknown
Scholars from Odisha